Janice Jordan (born 1964 in Ojai, California), is a Californian activist and health advocate who was a candidate for U.S. Vice President in the 2004 election as the candidate of the Peace and Freedom Party, as the running mate of Leonard Peltier. They received 27,607 votes. She was the party's candidate for Governor of California in 2006, receiving 69,934 votes, 0.8% of the total.

Jordan ran also for Congress in 1996 and 1998, for Mayor of San Diego in 2000, and for San Diego City Council in 2001.

References

External links
 Janice Jordan
 P&F Campaign 2006: Janice Jordan for Governor
 Janice Jordan for vice president. 2004 election

1964 births
Living people
Female candidates for Vice President of the United States
Peace and Freedom Party vice presidential nominees
People from Greater Los Angeles
People from Ojai, California
2004 United States vice-presidential candidates
21st-century American politicians
Women in California politics
21st-century American women politicians